Orange Valley Tea Garden is  a village in the Darjeeling Pulbazar CD block in the Darjeeling Sadar subdivision of the Darjeeling district in the state of West Bengal, India.

History
What was earlier known as Bloomfield Tea Garden was renamed Orange Valley Tea Garden, when the ownership was transferred from Bloomfield Tea Company to Orange Valley Tea Limited. It is now owned by the Bagaria Group.

Geography

Location                                            

Area overview
The map alongside shows the northern portion of the Darjeeling Himalayan hill region. In Darjeeling Sadar subdivision 61% of the total population lives in the rural areas and 39% of the population lives in the urban areas. There are 78 tea gardens/ estates (the figure varies slightly according to different sources), producing and largely exporting Darjeeling tea in the district. It engages a large proportion of the population directly/ indirectly. Some tea gardens were identified in the 2011 census as census towns or villages. Such places are marked in the map as CT (census town) or R (rural/ urban centre). Specific tea estate pages are marked TE.

Note: The map alongside presents some of the notable locations in the subdivision. All places marked in the map are linked in the larger full screen map.

Demographics
According to the 2011 Census of India, Bloomfield Tea Garden had a total population of 2,901 of which 1,434 (49%) were males and 1,467 (51%) were females. There were 219 persons in the age range of 0 to 6 years. The total number of literate people in Bloomfield Tea Garden was 2,229 (76.84% of the population over 6 years).

Orange Valley Tea Garden
Orange Valley Tea Garden is a bio-organic garden producing mainly black tea. It produces 110,000 kg tea annually from the old Chinary bushes planted by the British. These are replaced at the rate of 2% per year.

Orange Valley Tea Garden is a Hazard Analysis & Critical Control Point (HACCP) and certified as Bio-organic & Rain Forest Alliance, UTZ, ETP, COR, JAS. It has secured Fair Trade Certification.

The Bagaria Group is headed by Sheo Shankar Bagaria, assisted by Abhishek Bagaria and Asish Bagaria. In the Darjeeling hills, it also has tea gardens at Phuguri and Gayabaree & Millikthong, both in the Mirik area. One of the group companies Kusum International is tea trading and export set-up. It exports tea to Japan, Singapore, Sri Lanka, Dubai, European countries, USA and Canada.

References

External links
 

Villages in Darjeeling district